The Monmouth Formation is a geologic formation in Prince George's County, Maryland. It preserves fossils dating back to the Cretaceous period.

See also

 List of fossiliferous stratigraphic units in Maryland
 Paleontology in Maryland

References

 

Cretaceous Maryland